The 2005 WAFL season was the 121st season of the various incarnations of the West Australian Football League. It saw reigning premiers Subiaco's third consecutive minor premiership, despite the loss of key forward Brad Smith to the West Coast Eagles and knee surgery. Thirty-year-old reserves spearhead Lachlan Oakley proved a perfect replacement and scored eighty goals in his only full season before moving to Victoria and playing with Parkdale Vultures in the VAFA. The Lions were widely tipped to finish the season undefeated with their perceived depth, discipline and motivation, but after suffering only two defeats in the home-and-away season, the Lions collapsed severely in the finals for South Fremantle to claim their first premiership since 1997. The premiership was a wonderful finalé for Toby McGrath, who retired for an army career after the 2004 season, but returned to WA in February and rejoined the Bulldogs to win both the Sandover and Simpson Medals.

The finalists were unchanged from 2004, and there was an exceptionally wide gap between the top teams and their weakest rivals, with the bottom four clubs winning only four matches against the top five all season. Perennial battlers Perth suffered the largest change in fortune by falling from ten victories to three, but this was generally expected before the season began due to the controversial loss of sixty-goal spearhead Chris Maguire to Swan Districts after the Demons refused to clear him, future Hawthorn and Sydney superstar “Buddy” Franklin and the retiring Drew Cornelius, which left them without almost their entire 2004 goal-to-goal-line.

West Perth, also predicted to struggle due to the retirements of on-ballers Corey Johnson, Brendon Logan and Kim Rigoll, did better than expected after losing several players and continuing their bad injury run of 2004, whilst Peel Thunder, after finally achieving a permanent WAFL licence and not having to prove itself again by 2008, fell back from five wins to three.

The 2005 season saw the WAFL's judicial system use “video evidence”, introduced in the VFL/AFL in 1988, for the first time after demands from clubs in previous seasons when several offenders were completely unpunished. This new system was regarded as a success, with the number of reportable offences substantially reduced.

Poor crowds at Subiaco Oval finals meant this was the last season where WAFL matches before the Grand Final would be played there; from 2006 finals were played at the higher-ranked club's home ground. The problem was exacerbated by the issue of the WAFL as a family-orientated league and the lack of facilities for children to kick footballs around Subiaco.

Home-and-away season

Round 1

Round 2 (Easter weekend)

Round 3

Round 4

Round 5

Round 6 (Anzac Day)

Round 7

Round 8

Round 9

Round 10

Round 11

Round 12 (Foundation Day)

Round 13

Round 14

Round 15

Round 16

Round 17

Round 18

Round 19

Round 20

Round 21

Round 22

Round 23

Ladder

Finals

Semi-finals

Preliminary final

Grand Final

Notes
Peel Thunder officials saw the incident as a fair “hip-and-shoulder”.Shane Cable, son of former superstar Barry – who had played for and coached both teams – took over as Royals coach for the afternoon.

References

External links
Official WAFL website
West Australian Football League (WAFL), 2005

West Australian Football League seasons
WAFL